Schilderina is a genus of sea snails, marine gastropod molluscs in the subfamily Zonariinae of the family Cypraeidae, the cowries.

Species
 Schilderina achatidea (Gray, 1837)
  † Schilderina amygdalum (Brocchi, 1814) 
  † Schilderina andegavensis (Defrance, 1826) 
  † Schilderina austriaca (Schilder, 1927) 
  † Schilderina brebioni (Dolin & Lozouet, 2004) 
  † Schilderina charlesi Dolin & Aguerre, 2020 
  † Schilderina columbaria (Lamarck, 1822) 
  † Schilderina decorticata (Defrance, 1826) 
  † Schilderina dertoflavicula (Sacco, 1894) 
  † Schilderina elegantissima (Dolin & Lozouet, 2004) 
  † Schilderina longiscata (Mayer, 1875) 
  † Schilderina orbiculata (Dolin & Lozouet, 2004) 
  † Schilderina paulensis (Dolin & Lozouet, 2004) 
  † Schilderina semidenticulata (Sacco, 1894) 
  † Schilderina transsylvanica (Schilder, 1927) 
  † Schilderina utriculata (Lamarck, 1810) 
  † Schilderina vaesseni Dolin & Aguerre, 2020
Synonyms
 Schilderina auricoma (Crosse, 1897): synonym of Schilderina achatidea (Gray, 1837)
 Schilderina inopinata (Schilder, 1930): synonym of Schilderina achatidea inopinata (Schilder, 1930)
 Schilderina longinqua (Schilder & Schilder, 1938): synonym of Schilderina achatidea inopinata (Schilder, 1930)
 Schilderina oranica (Crosse, 1897): synonym of Schilderina achatidea (Gray, 1837)

References

 Dolin, L. & Aguerre, O. (2020). Description de deux espèces de Schilderina n. gen. (Mollusca, Caenogastropoda, Cypraeoidea) du Serravallien (Miocène moyen) du Béarn (Pyrénées-Atlantiques, France). Bulletin de la Société Linnéenne de Bordeaux. 155

Cypraeidae
Gastropod genera
Prehistoric gastropod genera